Joseph Sandy "Buddy" Hackman (February 6, 1906 – June 25, 1987) was an American football player and coach of football and basketball.

Playing years

Hackman was a halfback for the Tennessee Volunteers of the University of Tennessee from 1928 to 1930. He was part of Robert Neyland's first great backfield along with future All-Americans Gene McEver and Bobby Dodd. Hackman stood 5'11" and weighed 175 pounds. Hackman and McEver were sometimes called "Hack and Mack." McEver missed the entire 1930 season with torn ligaments in his knee. Hackman filled his role and made the All-Southern team. He was inducted into the Tennessee Sports Hall of Fame in 1974. Hackman wore number 15.

Coaching years
He coached the Roanoke College Maroons in basketball and baseball starting in 1936 and continuing to do so for nearly 35 years.

Head coaching record

College football

References

1906 births
1987 deaths
American football halfbacks
Roanoke Maroons baseball coaches
Roanoke Maroons football coaches
Roanoke Maroons men's basketball coaches
Tennessee Volunteers football players
High school football coaches in Florida
High school football coaches in Tennessee
All-Southern college football players
Sportspeople from Nashville, Tennessee
Coaches of American football from Tennessee
Players of American football from Nashville, Tennessee
Baseball coaches from Tennessee
Basketball coaches from Tennessee